Itziar Castro (Barcelona, February 14, 1977) is a Spanish actress known mainly for her role as Gоya Fernández in Vis a vis and for participating in films such as Campeones or Pieles,  for which she was nominated at the Goya Awards for best newcomer actress.

Biography 
Castro was born in Barcelona in 1977. Her professional career dates back to 2002, when she participated in the feature film Noche de fiesta. Since then, she has participated in fictions for both television and cinema, including in El cor de la ciutat or Algo que celebrar on television and in Blancanieves or La sexta alumna in cinema. In 2017 she signed for the main cast of the feature film directed by Eduardo Casanova Pieles, for which she was nominated for a Goya Award for best new actress and winner of the Unión de Actores y Actrices award in the same category.

In 2018 she was part of the main cast of Vis a vis in the role of Goya Fernández, a role for which she has received greater relevance at the television level. In addition, she participates in the feature films Matar a Dios and Campeones, and made a cameo in the second season of Paquita Salas, where she played the regidora of the Tarazona Festival. In July 2018, she signed on to play the acting teacher of the academy of Operación Triunfo 2018, replacing Javier Ambrossi and Javier Calvo. On October 31, just over a month after the edition started, it was learned that the actress was leaving her job in the program, apparently a decision taken unilaterally by the program's management.

In 2019 she participated in the feature films El cerro de los dioses by Daniel M. Caneiro and ¿Qué te juegas? by Inés de León. In 2020 she made a cameo in Woody Allen's film Rifkin's Festival and starred in the Fox España series Vis a vis: El Oasis, as well as having a recurring role in the HBO Spain series Por H o por B as Choni. She is also one of the protagonists of Historias lamentables, a film by Javier Fesser for Amazon Prime Video. In December 2020 her signing was announced as the main character for the first Netflix musical series in Spain Érase una vez... pero ya no directed by Manolo Caro.

Filmography

Cinema

Feature films

Short films 

 Los Bermejo (Dir. José Fernández-Ark, 2018), secondary role.
 Desaliento (Dir. Pinky Alonso, 2018), leading role.
 RIP (Dir. Caye Casas and Albert Pintó, 2017), leading role.
 Eat my shit (Dir. Eduardo Casanova, 2015), leading role.
 La Colleja (Dir. Sergio Morcillo, 2019), leading role.

Television

Series

Programs

Awards 

 Goya Awards

 Unión de Actores y Actrices

 Festival Rojo Sangre

 Festival cine calella

 Premios Fugaz

References

External links 
 Itziar Castro on IMDb

Spanish lesbian actresses
Actresses from Barcelona
21st-century Spanish actresses
Living people
1977 births
Spanish television actresses
Spanish film actresses